Chelonoidis niger vicina, commonly known as the Cerro Azul giant tortoise, Iguana Cove tortoise or the Isabela Island giant tortoise, is a subspecies of Galápagos tortoise endemic to Isabela Island in the Galápagos.

Population history
This population was depleted by seamen in the last 200 years and by extensive slaughter in the late 1950s and 1960s by employees of cattle companies based at Iguana Cove. Their population is thought to overlap with Chelonoidis niger guentheri.

Description
It has a thick, heavy shell intermediate between saddle-backed and domed, and not appreciably narrowed anteriorly. Males are larger and more saddle-backed; females are more domed. Until eradication programs, virtually all nests and hatchlings were destroyed by black rats, pigs, dogs, and cats.

References

 Günther, 1875 : Descriptions of the living and extinct races of gigantic land–tortoises. Parts I and II. Introduction, and the tortoises of the Galapagos Islands. Philosophical Transactions of the Royal Society of London, .

Chelonoidis
Species
Taxa named by Albert Günther
Endemic reptiles of the Galápagos Islands
Reptiles described in 1875